Aneta Germanova (born 3 January 1975) is a retired Bulgarian female volleyball player.

She was part of the Bulgaria women's national volleyball team at the 1998 FIVB Volleyball Women's World Championship in Japan, and the 2002 FIVB Volleyball Women's World Championship in Germany. She played for Olympiacos in 2006-07 season.

References

External links
 
 profile at volleyball-movies.net

1975 births
Living people
Bulgarian women's volleyball players
Olympiacos Women's Volleyball players
Place of birth missing (living people)
Opposite hitters